The Jolt is a 1921 American silent drama film directed by George Marshall and starring Edna Murphy, Johnnie Walker and Raymond McKee.

Cast
 Edna Murphy as 	Georgette
 Johnnie Walker as Johnnie Stanton
 Raymond McKee as 	Terence Nolan
 Albert Prisco as 	Jerry Limur
 Bertram Anderson-Smith as Colonel Anderson 
 Clarence Wilson as Georgette's Father
 Lule Warrenton as Georgette's Mother

References

Bibliography
 Connelly, Robert B. The Silents: Silent Feature Films, 1910-36, Volume 40, Issue 2. December Press, 1998.
 Munden, Kenneth White. The American Film Institute Catalog of Motion Pictures Produced in the United States, Part 1. University of California Press, 1997.
 Solomon, Aubrey. The Fox Film Corporation, 1915-1935: A History and Filmography. McFarland, 2011.

External links
 

1921 films
1921 drama films
1920s English-language films
American silent feature films
Silent American drama films
American black-and-white films
Fox Film films
Films directed by George Marshall
1920s American films